is a village located in Higashikunisaki District, Ōita Prefecture, Japan.

The name Himeshima literally means "Princess Island". The village is on a small island, sometimes referred to as Hime Island, just off the Japanese island of Kyūshū, and is accessible by ferry.

As of March 2017, the village has an estimated population of 1,930 and the density of 280 persons per km². The total area is 6.98 km². The main occupations are fishing and shrimp farming. Every summer, there is a Shinto religious ceremony featuring dancers dressed as foxes.

There is currently only one school on the island (Himeshima Junior High School was closed due to depopulation, leaving only Himejima Elementary School behind here).

In the 2017 Japanese general election, 77.51% of Himeshima's proportional ballots were cast for either one of the two parties in the conservative ruling coalition (the Liberal Democratic Party and Komeito) or one of the two minor LDP-allied conservative parties (Party for Japanese Kokor) and New Party Daichi), making it the most conservative municipality in the country in this election under that definition (excluding Kuroshima Island's 82.76% conservative voting result, as this island is technically a part of Matsuura, Nagasaki and not its own municipality).

Famous people 

 Eiichi Nishimura - Politician and minister

References

External links

 Himeshima official website 
 Himeshima, Ōita - General information about Himeshima 
 Himeshima Cuisine - Information about Himeshima cuisine 

Villages in Ōita Prefecture